Gezaldara may refer to:
Aznvadzor, Armenia
Gekhadzor, Armenia
Vardenik, Armenia
Verkhnyaya Gezaldara, Armenia